Morten Madsen (born 16 January 1987) is a Danish former professional ice hockey forward who played most notably in the Swedish Hockey League (SHL).

Playing career
Morten Madsen was drafted by the Minnesota Wild in the 4th round, 122nd overall, in the 2005 NHL Entry Draft. After being drafted, Madsen joined the Victoriaville Tigres of the QMJHL for the 2006–07 season. In his lone season in the QMJHL, he registered 32 goals and 68 assists for 100 points in 62 games. In six playoff games with the Tigres, he scored three goals and added six assists in six games. Before entering the QMJHL, he played for Frölunda HC's junior team in Sweden. Before moving to Sweden, he played junior hockey for Danish Rødovre Mighty Bulls as well as two games for Rødovre's senior team at the age of 15.

In 2007 Madsen signed a three-year contract with Minnesota Wild in NHL but only got to play with the Houston Aeros in the AHL. After two seasons with Houston, he signed a try-out contract with Modo Hockey in the Swedish Elitserien. His stay with MODO proved successful, and he extended his contract, which now runs until the end of the 2012–13 season. Prior to the 2010–11 season, he was named an alternate captain for the Örnsköldsvik team.

After four seasons with Modo, Madsen left out of contract to sign a deal in Germany with the Hamburg Freezers of the Deutsche Eishockey Liga on 8 April 2013. In March 2015, he inked a fresh three-year deal with the Freezers. The organization folded in May 2016, making Madsen and the entire squad free agents. On 27 June 2016, he signed with Karlskrona HC of the Swedish Hockey League (SHL).

Following completion of the 2021–22 season with Timrå IK, Madsen announced his retirement after 17 professional seasons; however, he would remain with Timrå IK in stepping into Sports Coordinator and Scout role.

International play
Madsen was a member of Team Denmark at the 2006 World Championships in Riga, Latvia. He would play in three games without registering a point.

In December 2006, Madsen played a key role as the Danish team, playing on home ice in Odense, gained promotion from the World Junior Ice Hockey Championships Pool I to the top flight for the first time ever. Madsen was the top scorer for the Danish team, notching two goals and seven assists in 5 games.

In 2007, Madsen was once again a member of Team Denmark at the 2007 World Championships in Moscow, Russia. He played in 5 games, scoring one goal.

Career statistics

Regular season and playoffs

International

References

External links
 

1987 births
Danish ice hockey left wingers
Frölunda HC players
Houston Aeros (1994–2013) players
Hamburg Freezers players
Karlskrona HK players
Living people
Minnesota Wild draft picks
Modo Hockey players
People from Rødovre
Rødovre Mighty Bulls players
Texas Wildcatters players
Timrå IK players
Victoriaville Tigres players
Ice hockey players at the 2022 Winter Olympics
Olympic ice hockey players of Denmark
Sportspeople from the Capital Region of Denmark